This is a simplified family tree of the Timurid dynasty. The Timurid dynasty was a ruling house descended from the Central Asian conqueror Timur, who founded the Timurid Empire in 1370. At its peak, the empire encompassed Iran and much of Central Asia, as well as portions of modern-day India, Pakistan, Syria and Turkey. Following its fall in the early 16th century, Timur's great-great-great grandson Babur established the Mughal Empire in South Asia, becoming the first Mughal emperor. His descendants eventually came to rule most of the Indian subcontinent.

Timurid dynasty

Mughal emperors

 
Dynasty genealogy